August Mollén (born 26 August 1999) is an orienteering competitor from Sweden. He won a silver medal in the 2022 World Orienteering Championships, coming second in the first ever knock-out sprint event behind Matthias Kyburz. Mollén was just one second behind Kyburz at the finish.

Mollén only completed his first ranking FootO event in 2021, one year before World Orienteering Championships success. In 2022, he came fourth at the Swedish sprint orienteering championships, leading him to be selected for a sprint event at the 2022 Orienteering World Cup on the 28th May, where he came third in the knock-out sprint. Just over a month later, Mollén achieved his first medal at a World Championships event.

Mollén competes for OK Denseln.

Mollén is currently studying Industrial Engineering and Management at Chalmers University of Technology.

References

1999 births
Living people
Swedish orienteers
Male orienteers
Foot orienteers
World Orienteering Championships medalists
20th-century Swedish people
21st-century Swedish people